Niagara Lock Monsters are a Canadian professional indoor lacrosse team that play in the Canadian Lacrosse League. The Lock Monsters play out of the Meridian Centre in St. Catharines, Ontario.

History

The Peel Avengers were founded in the summer of 2011 in Brampton, Ontario.

The Avengers played their first game ever on January 7, 2012 in Hagersville, Ontario.  The Avengers defeated Durham TurfDogs 16-9 to pick up their first win in franchise history.  The Avengers would finish the 2012 campaign with a 5-9 record landing them in last place with only 10 pts.  The Avengers did not qualify for the post season.

In the summer of 2012, the team was moved to St. Catharines and renamed the Niagara Lock Monsters.  With a new look and a new roster, the Lock Monsters were able to secure top spot in the standings with a record of 11-3.  In light of their first-place finish, the Lock Monsters earned a bye into the semi finals and were set to face the Iroquois Ironmen.  In a back and forth nail biter of a game, the Ironmen defeated the league champion Lock Monsters by a score of 16-15.  Deemed one of the most exciting games in league history, the Ironmen would go on to become the second league champion and claim the honour of hoisting the coveted Creator's Cup.

On April 4, 2014, the Lock Monsters defeated the Ohsweken Demons 10-9 in overtime to win their first Creator's Cup.

Season-by-season record
''Note: GP = Games played, W = Wins, L = Losses, T = Ties, OTL = Overtime losses, Pts = Points, GF = Goals for, GA = Goals against

References

External links
Official CLax website

Canadian Lacrosse League
Lacrosse teams in Ontario
Sport in St. Catharines
Lacrosse clubs established in 2011
2011 establishments in Ontario
2016 disestablishments in Ontario
Sports clubs disestablished in 2016